Kevin Joseph Jude Michel (born 26 March 1961) is an Australian politician. He has been a Labor member of the Western Australian Legislative Assembly since the 2017 state election, representing Pilbara.

Michel was born in Golden Rock, India, and migrated to Australia in 1990. He ran an air conditioning business in Karratha before entering politics.

References

1961 births
Living people
Australian Labor Party members of the Parliament of Western Australia
Members of the Western Australian Legislative Assembly
Indian emigrants to Australia
Australian people of Indian descent
21st-century Australian politicians